Dummy Mace is a 1901 New Zealand short film.

Plot
Three rounds of a staged boxing match, with a third round knockout.

Cast
Tommy Macgregor - featherweight boxer (champion in New Zealand)
Harry "Dummy" Mace - middleweight boxer (champion in Australia)

Production
Alf Linley offered Franklyn Barrett finance to produce a boxing picture. Barrett organized two boxers to stage a three one minute round boxing match on the back lawn of the Hotel Cecil. Although Macgregor was to give a knockout blow on cue in the third round, Mace who was deaf, had misunderstood the arrangement and actually knocked out Macgregor.

The resultant film did very good business when subsequently shown in the Federal Hall theatre in Manners Street Wellington.

Preservation status
This 1901 film was New Zealand's first boxing film and is now a lost film.

References

1900s New Zealand films
1901 films
1901 in New Zealand
Lost New Zealand films
1901 short films
New Zealand silent short films
1900s lost films
Films directed by Franklyn Barrett